Jeon Seon-ok (born 23 January 1952) is a South Korean speed skater. She competed in three events at the 1972 Winter Olympics.

References

External links
 

1952 births
Living people
South Korean female speed skaters
Olympic speed skaters of South Korea
Speed skaters at the 1972 Winter Olympics
Place of birth missing (living people)
20th-century South Korean women